Captain Robert St Leger Fowler MC (7 April 1891 – 13 June 1925) was an Irish first-class cricketer, often regarded as the best Irish cricketer not to have represented Ireland itself. Fowler was a right-handed batsman who bowled right-arm off break. He is perhaps best known for his outstanding all round performance as captain of Eton College in the match against Harrow in 1910, the match commonly referred to as Fowler's match.

Family
Fowler was born at his family home at Rahinstown, in Enfield, County Meath, Ireland. His father Robert Henry Fowler had attended RMC Sandhurst and joined the British Army in 1878, becoming a captain in the King's Shropshire Light Infantry in 1886, and had played one first-class cricket match for Cambridge University against the Marylebone Cricket Club in 1876. His great-great grandfather, also Robert, was Bishop of Ossory and then Bishop of Ossory, Ferns and Leighlin from 1817 until his death in 1841, and his great-great-great grandfather, Robert Fowler was a Protestant clergyman who settled in Ireland in the 1760s and was Archbishop of Dublin from 1779 until his death in 1801.

Fowler attended Mr Hawtrey's prep school in Westgate-on-Sea, and then Eton College, where he was influenced by his housemaster, Cyril Wells, an amateur cricketer who played for Middlesex. Fowler played for Eton against Harrow School in the 1908 and 1909 Eton v Harrow fixtures. Harrow won easily in 1908, and the 1909 fixture was drawn, although Fowler's 11 wickets for 79 runs gave Eton a fighting chance.

Fowler's match

In 1910, Fowler was 19 years old, and captain of cricket in his last year at Eton.  His performance in the 1910 Eton v Harrow match has become a cricket legend, of such note that the 1910 match has been nicknamed Fowler's match.

The two-day two-innings cricket match was held at Lord's on Friday 8 and Saturday 9 July 1910.  He was one of only three survivors from Eton's 1909 team, but Harrow had seven veterans from the 1909 match and came to the match unbeaten.  Before the match, The Times noted that Harrow's captain Guy Earle "bowls extraordinarily fast for a boy" but that "is not deadly on a good wicket, but can make every use of a difficult one".  Also playing in the match was a schoolboy who would become a field-marshal (Alexander), another an air vice-marshal (Blount), and a third an attorney-general (Monckton), together with various sons of nobility.

Harrow won the toss, and batted first, scoring 232.  Despite some bad luck, Fowler took 4 wickets.  Eton were dismissed early on the second day for 67, with Fowler top scorer on 21, the only Eton batsman to reach double figures.  Eton followed on, and subsided to 65-5 shortly after lunch.  But Fowler was still batting, and added 42 runs for the sixth wicket with Wigan and 57 runs for the seventh wicket with Boswell.  Fowler was eventually out for 64 runs, the highest individual innings in the match, with 8 fours, a three, 10 twos and 9 singles, with Eton one run ahead.  Heroic batting by the tenth wicket partnership of Manners and Lister-Kaye gave Eton a slender lead of 55 runs.  Fowler's extraordinary bowling took 8 wickets, 5 bowled, to dismiss Harrow for 45, 10 runs short of the target.

Fowler's outstanding all round batting and bowling performance allowed Eton to win a match that appeared all but lost after Harrow School asked Eton to follow on 165 runs in arrears.  Wisden stated that: "In the whole history of cricket, there has been nothing more sensational" and The Times said that "A more exciting match can hardly ever have been played", continuing effusively, with a reference to the inaugural Ashes Test at The Oval in 1882, "to boys the bowling of Fowler was probably more formidable than Spofforth's to England". Fowler ended the match having scored 21 and 64 runs, and taken 4-90 and 8-23.  The Times described Fowler's contribution in the following terms: "in the whole history of public school cricket nothing better can have been seen than Fowler's play on the second day".

Army career
Fowler enrolled at Sandhurst in 1910, where he won the Sword of Honour in 1911.  He was commissioned in the 17th Lancers.

Fowler served in the First World War as a captain in the 17th Lancers.  He was awarded the Military Cross in the defence of Amiens in 1918.

He was also British Army rackets champion.

Cricket
Fowler made his first-class debut for the Marylebone Cricket Club against Fowler's future club, Hampshire. Fowler played two matches for the MCC in 1913, with his final appearance coming against Cambridge University.

After the war, Fowler represented the British Army in first-class matches, making his debut against the Royal Navy in 1919. Fowler represented the Army in fifteen first-class matches, making his final appearance for the Army in 1924 against the Royal Navy. In his fifteen matches for the Army, Fowler scored 636 runs at an average of 35.30, with a high score of 92*, one of four half centuries. With his tidy and accurate off breaks, Fowler took 49 wickets at a bowling average of 17.85, with best figures of 7-22 which was one of Fowler's two five wicket hauls, both in 1924.

As well as representing the Army, Fowler also represented the Combined Services in three first-class matches against the touring Australians in 1921, Essex in 1922 and the touring South Africans in 1924.

In 1924 Fowler made his first-class debut for Hampshire against Middlesex at Lord's, in the 1924 County Championship. Fowler played two more matches for the club, all in the same season against the touring South Africans and Middlesex. Fowler scored 106 runs at an average of 17.66, with two half centuries and a high score of 51. Fowler was less successful with the ball for the club, taking only four wickets at an average of 51.50.

Fowler's final first-class match came for the Gentlemen in the Gentlemen v Players fixture in Blackpool in 1924.

Outside of first-class cricket, he toured North America with Incogniti in 1920, where he scored 142 against All Philadelphia, playing with Douglas Jardine. The same year Fowler toured Germany with the Free Foresters and in 1923 Fowler toured Canada with them. He played for the Army against Public Schools in 1922, 1923 and 1924, having played for Public Schools against the MCC in 1909 and 1910, and for Eton Ramblers.  He is regarded as the best Irish cricketer not to have represented Ireland itself.

He was selected to tour New Zealand in 1922-23 in a team led by Archie MacLaren, but the Army refused him leave.  He was appointed captain of a proposed MCC tour to West Indies in 1924–25, but the tour was postponed until the following year.

Early death
Fowler died at Rahinstown, Enfield, County Meath from leukemia in June 1925. He was 34 years old.

References

External links
Robert Fowler at Cricinfo
Robert Fowler at CricketArchive
Matches and detailed statistics for Robert Fowler
Profile of Robert Fowler 
Wisden obituary, 1926

1891 births
1925 deaths
Military personnel from County Meath
People from County Meath
People educated at Eton College
People educated at Hawtreys
Irish cricketers
Marylebone Cricket Club cricketers
British Army cricketers
Combined Services cricketers
Hampshire cricketers
Free Foresters cricketers
Gentlemen cricketers
British Army personnel of World War I
17th Lancers officers
Recipients of the Military Cross
Deaths from cancer in the Republic of Ireland
Deaths from leukemia
Graduates of the Royal Military College, Sandhurst